Music described as piano six hands  is for three pianists at one piano. More rarely the neologism 'Triet' is used, by analogy with the duo/duet distinction sometimes made between 2 pianos and piano four hands (and also because piano trio is an already established term). 
Because of the limited range available to each player, many of the pieces written for this combination are elementary in nature; many more are arrangements of pieces for other forces. But there are a small number of original works, and a handful of virtuoso three-player groups have emerged in the 21st century.

Examples
Compositions include five pieces by Percy Grainger, Sergei Rachmaninoff's Romance and Valse, Alfred Schnittke's Hommage, Carl Czerny's opp. 17, 84, 227–229, 295–298, 609, 689, 741 and 798, Jean Cras's "Âmes d’enfants", Cornelius Gurlitt's six Tönstucke, Op. 192, Paul Robinson's "Pensees" and "Montmartre", various pieces by German composer , Bulgarian composer Tomislav Baynov's "Metrorhythmia 1", John Pitts's "Are You Going?", Greek composer Dionysis Boukouvalas's "Fantasy on a theme by Steve Reich", Canadian composer Paul Frehner's "Slowdown", Malaysian composer Samuel Cho's "S[wim]", Italian composer Fabio Mengozzi's "Promenade".

Performing groups
AXA: One Piano, Six Hands
ATM Triet
Severnside Composers Alliance
Trio Philagrande
Trio Pianistico di Bologna

External links

References

Piano
Musical terminology